Labello is a brand of lip balm stick. It is produced by  Beiersdorf AG in Germany and Austria. The labello lip care sticks are also sold under the name Labello Nivea, Liposan and Nivea Lip Care. Labello makes lip care products that are used for medical treatments, moisturizing, protection from sun or solely for cosmetic purposes.

The word "labello" comes from the Latin words "labium" ("lip") and "bellus" ("beautiful").

History

In 1909, Dr. Oscar Troplowitz created a lip caring balm. The brand was introduced in Germany and later in Switzerland and Austro-Hungary. At that time, the products were sticks wrapped in paper that had to be applied with a finger. In 1911, a new sliding case made of tin was introduced. This turned out to be a rather successful approach. During the First World War, the shortage of the tin resources caused the production of tin packaging to be stopped. However, refills that could be inserted in the existing tubes were available in the market.

In 1922, the packaging was replaced with a light aluminium stick, which made it easier for the consumer to carry it around. This was also a success. By 1935, Labello was made available in markets of over thirty countries. During the Second World War, Labello products were again in extremely short supply as aluminum was almost unobtainable until the end of the war. 

In 1953, a plastic sleeve replaced the metal one, which had been used for more than 30 years. In 1958, Labello started to make products for use by men as well. A practical twist mechanism was added in 1963, making application easier. This was apparently the most successful product launch in the history of the Labello brand.

In 1973, the 'Labello Classic' in blue casing was introduced which is produced even today. In 1978, the brand released 'Labello Med' that provided treatment for severe lip problems. A year later, 'Labello Sun' was introduced which provided protection of lips from harmful sun rays. In 1984, another product, 'Labello Camomile' was made available in market. This was the first time the brand made a product containing natural flavors and ingredients. Two years later, 'Labello Rosé' was also released. In 1989, 'Labello Sport' was introduced for physically active consumers who wanted lip care. 

In 1992, 'Lip Balance' series were released for consumers wanting immediate moisturizing for their lips. The series consisted of two products: 'Labello Hydro', which is still used today and 'Labello Regeneration'. The later of which was the first product in the brand to be released in a squeezable tube packaging. Two years later, 'Labello UV Alpin' was made available that provided care for lips in winter and cold weathers. In 1999, the brand launched 17 different fruit flavored lip pomades for the first time including 'Apricot Cream', 'Lemon Twist', 'Manadarin Vanilla', 'Orange', 'Sweet Melon' and 'Tropical Shake' among others. Today's assortment includes 'Cherry', 'Strawberry','Pomegranate' and 'Pink Guava'.

In 2001, a lip balm and gloss, 'Labello Pearl & Shine', was introduced for women. This marked the first time the brand took a turn into the cosmetics direction. Three years later, 'Care Gloss & Shine' lip gloss range were introduced in the market. These were available in trendy colours and as well as a transparent gloss. In 2009, Labello celebrated their 100 years by launching a limited edition of 'Labello Classic'.

Product line

Care range

Classic/Classic Care
3 Limited Editions
+ Classic 100 years
Med/Med Care/Med Protection (1978–present)
SOS/Med SOS/SOS Lip Balm
Sun/Sun Care (1979–present)
Sport/Active/Active Care/For Men (1989–present)
Hydro/Moisture/Hydro Care (1992–present)
Regeneration/Rejuvenation Q10 (1992–present)
Lip Effect Q10
UV Alpin/Extreme Alpin (1994–present)
Lipbalance/Intensiv Balance (discontinued)
Sensitive/Sensitive Care
Natural Volume

Flavored range

Ananas/Pineapple (discontinued)
Apricot/Apricot Cream (discontinued)
Camomile/Kamille/Camomile and Calendula (1984–present)
Cherry/Fruity Shine Cherry (1999–present)
Dragonfruit/Fruity Shine Dragonfruit (discontinued)
Grapes (discontinued)
Green Apple (Grüner Apfel) (discontinued)
Himbeere (raspberry) (discontinued)
Juicy Fantasy/Juicy Splash (discontinued)
Lemon Twist (discontinued)
Lime and Orange (discontinued)
Mandarin Vanilla (discontinued)
Mango
Menthol/Mint/Mint and Minerals
Milk and Honey
Olive and Lemon
Orange (discontinued)
Passion Fruits (discontinued)
Peach (discontinued)
Pink Grapefruit (discontinued)
Pink Guava
Peppermint Flamingo (discontinued)
Pomegranate/Fruity Shine Pomegranate
Rose/Rosé/Soft Rosé/Velvet Rosé (1986–present)
Strawberry/Fruity Shine Strawberry (1999–present)
Summer Fruits (discontinued)
Sweet Melon (discontinued)
Tropical Shake (discontinued)
Vitamin Power (discontinued)
Vitamin Shake: ACAI & WILD APPLE
Vitamin Shake: CRANBERRY & RASPBERRY
Fruity Shine: Peach
Fruity Shine: Watermelon

Gloss range

Pearl & Shine (2001–present)
4 Limited Editions
Gold & Shine (discontinued)
Angelstar/Angel Star
Care Gloss & Shine (till 2009)
Lovely Red
Mocca (discontinued)
Natural
Angle Star
Pure Natural
Glamorous Gloss series (2009–present)
Natural
Pink Sugar
Ruby Red

Other

Good Night Kiss (discontinued)
Light Kiss (2009–present)
Repair and Beauty (2012-present)

Gallery

External links 
 Official homepage of Labello Lipcare

Beiersdorf brands
Products introduced in 1909